Events are often triggered when a stochastic or random process first encounters a threshold. The threshold can be a barrier, boundary or specified state of a system. The amount of time required for a stochastic process, starting from some initial state, to encounter a threshold for the first time is referred to variously as a first hitting time. 
In statistics, first-hitting-time models are a sub-class of survival models.  The first hitting time, also called first passage time, of the barrier set  with respect to an instance of a stochastic process is the time until the stochastic process first enters .

More colloquially, a first passage time in a stochastic system, is the time taken for a state variable to reach a certain value. Understanding this metric allows one to further understand the physical system under observation, and as such has been the topic of research in very diverse fields, from economics to ecology.

The idea that a first hitting time of a stochastic process might describe the time to occurrence of an event has a long history, starting with an interest in the first passage time of Wiener diffusion processes in economics and then in physics in the early 1900s. Modeling the probability of financial ruin as a first passage time was an early application in the field of insurance. An interest in the mathematical properties of first-hitting-times and statistical models and methods for analysis of survival data appeared steadily between the middle and end of the 20th century.

Examples
A common example of a first-hitting-time model is a ruin problem, such as Gambler's ruin.  In this example, an entity (often described as a gambler or an insurance company) has an amount of money which varies randomly with time, possibly with some drift.  The model considers the event that the amount of money reaches 0, representing bankruptcy.  The model can answer questions such as the probability that this occurs within finite time, or the mean time until which it occurs.

First-hitting-time models can be applied to expected lifetimes, of patients or mechanical devices. When the process reaches an adverse threshold state for the first time, the patient dies, or the device breaks down.

First passage time of a 1D Brownian particle
One of the simplest and omnipresent stochastic systems is that of the Brownian particle in one dimension. This system describes the motion of a particle which moves stochastically in one dimensional space, with equal probability of moving to the left or to the right. Given that Brownian motion is used often as a tool to understand more complex phenomena, it is important to understand the probability of a first passage time of the Brownian particle of reaching some position distant from its start location. This is done through the following means.
 
The probability density function (PDF) for a particle in one dimension is found by solving the one-dimensional diffusion equation. (This equation states that the position probability density diffuses outward over time. It is analogous to say, cream in a cup of coffee if the cream was all contained within some small location initially. After a long time the cream has diffused throughout the entire drink evenly.) Namely,

The bar in the argument of the instantaneous probability refers to the conditional probability. The diffusion equation states that the rate of change over time in the probability of finding the particle at  position depends on the deceleration over distance of such probability at that position.

It can be shown that the one-dimensional PDF is

More specifically the Full Width at Half Maximum (FWHM) – technically, this is actually the Full Duration at Half Maximum as the independent variable is time – scales like

Using the PDF one is able to derive the average of a given function, at time :

where the average is taken over all space (or any applicable variable).

The First Passage Time Density (FPTD)  is the probability that a particle has first reached a point  at exactly time  (not at some time during the interval up to ). This probability density is calculable from the Survival probability (a more common probability measure in statistics). Consider the absorbing boundary condition  (The subscript c for the absorption point  is an abbreviation for cliff used in many texts as an analogy to an absorption point). The PDF satisfying this boundary condition is given by

where  is the error function. If one uses the first-order Taylor approximation, the definition of the FPTD follows):

By using the diffusion equation and integrating, the explicit FPTD is

The first-passage time for a Brownian particle therefore follows a Lévy distribution.

For , it follows from above that

where . This equation states that the probability for a Brownian particle achieving a first passage at some long time
(defined in the paragraph above) becomes increasingly small, but always finite.

The first moment of the FPTD diverges (as it is a so-called heavy-tailed distribution), therefore one cannot calculate the average FPT, so instead, one can calculate the typical time, the time when the FPTD is at a maximum, i.e.,

First-hitting-time applications in many families of stochastic processes
First hitting times are central features of many families of stochastic processes, including Poisson processes, Wiener processes, gamma processes, and Markov chains, to name but a few. The state of the stochastic process may represent, for example, the strength of a physical system, the health of an individual, or the financial condition of a business firm. The system, individual or firm fails or experiences some other critical endpoint when the process reaches a threshold state for the first time.  The critical event may be an adverse event (such as equipment failure, congested heart failure, or lung cancer) or a positive event (such as recovery from illness, discharge from hospital stay, child birth, or return to work after traumatic injury). The lapse of time until that critical event occurs is usually interpreted generically as a ‘survival time’. In some applications, the threshold is a set of multiple states so one considers competing first hitting times for reaching the first threshold in the set, as is the case when considering competing causes of failure in equipment or death for a patient.

Threshold regression: first-hitting-time regression
Practical applications of theoretical models for first hitting times often involve regression structures. When first hitting time models are equipped with regression structures, accommodating covariate data, we call such regression structure threshold regression. The threshold state, parameters of the process, and even time scale may depend on corresponding covariates. Threshold regression as applied to time-to-event data has emerged since the start of this century and has grown rapidly, as described in a 2006 survey article  and its references. Connections between threshold regression models derived from first hitting times and the ubiquitous Cox proportional hazards regression model  was investigated in. Applications of threshold regression range over many fields, including the physical and natural sciences, engineering, social sciences, economics and business, agriculture, health and medicine.

Latent vs observable 
In many real world applications, a first-hitting-time (FHT) model has three underlying components: (1) a parent stochastic process , which might be latent, (2) a threshold (or the barrier) and (3) a time scale. The first hitting time is defined as the time when the stochastic process first reaches the threshold. It is very important to distinguish whether the sample path of the parent process is latent (i.e., unobservable) or observable, and such distinction is a characteristic of the FHT model. By far, latent processes are most common. To give an example, we can use a Wiener process  as the parent stochastic process. Such Wiener process can be defined with the mean parameter  , the variance parameter  , and the initial value .

Operational or analytical time scale
The time scale of the stochastic process may be calendar or clock time or some more operational measure of time progression, such as mileage of a car, accumulated wear and tear on a machine component or accumulated exposure to toxic fumes. In many applications, the stochastic process describing the system state is latent or unobservable and its properties must be inferred indirectly from censored time-to-event data and/or readings taken over time on correlated processes, such as marker processes. The word ‘regression’ in threshold regression refers to first-hitting-time models in which one or more regression structures are inserted into the model in order to connect model parameters to explanatory variables or covariates. The parameters given regression structures may be parameters of the stochastic process, the threshold state and/or the time scale itself.

See also
 Survival analysis
 Proportional hazards models

References

 
 

 
 

Survival analysis
Regression with time series structure
Regression models